Galectin-related protein, also known as HSPC159, is a human gene.

References

Further reading